Jet Black is the fourth studio album by Canadian singer-songwriter Gentleman Reg, released February 24, 2009. It is his second release on Arts & Crafts, following the compilation Little Buildings in 2008, and his first album of new material since Darby & Joan in 2004.

"You Can't Get it Back" was released as an advance single in fall 2008.

Track listing

Personnel
The album features contributions from Greg Millson, Bry Webb, Katie Sketch, Elizabeth Powell, Kevin Drew, and Emily Haines.

References

2009 albums
Gentleman Reg albums
Arts & Crafts Productions albums